Uwe Grauer (born 1 January 1970 in Dortmund) is a German football coach and a former player. He is currently working as assistant manager for 1. FC Köln II.

Honours
Borussia Dortmund
 UEFA Cup finalist: 1992–93

References

External links
 

1970 births
Living people
Footballers from Dortmund
German footballers
Association football defenders
Borussia Dortmund players
Borussia Dortmund II players
KFC Uerdingen 05 players
SSV Ulm 1846 players
SG Wattenscheid 09 players
FC Schalke 04 II players
Hammer SpVg players
Bundesliga players
2. Bundesliga players
German football managers
West German footballers